The Decline is an EP by NOFX. It was released on November 23, 1999. The CD version consisted of only the 18-minute title track, but the vinyl included a different version of "Clams Have Feelings Too" (from Pump Up the Valuum) on the B-side. The Decline is largely a satire of American politics and law, with an overwhelming concern for blind behaviors of the masses, such as complacency, indifference, gun violence, drug-use, and conformity, as well as destruction of constitutional rights, and condemnation of the religious right. Although the lyrics are somewhat disjointed, they all refer back to the unifying theme of the "decline" of America. The  trombone is played by Lars Nylander of Skankin' Pickle.

According to the band,

The first 155 copies were pressed on clear vinyl, a version which is no longer available.

The first 1 min and 20 seconds of a live version of The Decline is played as an encore after "Stickin' In My Eye" on They've Actually Gotten Worse Live! (2007) before being faded out. A DVD featuring a live performance of The Decline was released on September 12, 2012.

In 2016, an orchestral arrangement was released as part of the Mild in the Streets: Fat Music Unplugged compilation album, recorded by Baz and His Orchestra. Additionally, a video of the performance has been released.  In 2019 NOFX and Baz's Orchestra recorded a live version while performing at the Red Rocks Amphitheatre in Morrison, Colorado and it was subsequently published in 2020.

See also
American decline
Punk ideology

References

NOFX EPs
Fat Wreck Chords EPs
1999 EPs
Albums produced by Ryan Greene